The Broadway Hotel is a historic hotel building located in Portland, Oregon, built in 1913. As of 2009, it was managed as single room occupancy apartments under the name Helen M. Swindell Apartments. It is listed on the National Register of Historic Places. It was designed by Portland architect John Virginius Bennes's Bennes and Hendricks firm.

See also
National Register of Historic Places listings in Northwest Portland, Oregon

References

External links

1913 establishments in Oregon
Apartment buildings on the National Register of Historic Places in Portland, Oregon
Buildings designated early commercial in the National Register of Historic Places
Commercial Style architecture in the United States
Hotel buildings completed in 1913
Hotel buildings on the National Register of Historic Places in Portland, Oregon
Northwest Portland, Oregon
Portland Historic Landmarks